Regan Sander Wirahardja Oey is a Canadian film and television actor. His parents are of Chinese-Indonesian descent.

Oey has had starring roles in two feature films, the American comedy hit Kickin It Old Skool (2007), in which he played a kid in toy store with Jamie Kennedy, and a leading role in the horror-thriller They Wait (2007),  starring Cheng Pei-pei, Terry Chen and Jaime King, in which he played the part of Sammy. He has also appeared in the TV series Saved (2006), playing the part of Cody, in an episode entitled 'Cowboys & Independents' (6th episode). His most recent role was in one episode of the TV Series The Guard on Global TV.

Oey attended Vancouver College as a two-sport athlete playing football and basketball.

Filmography
 Saved (2006) as Cody (Episode: "Cowboys & Independents")
 Kickin It Old Skool (2007) as Kid in Toy Store
 They Wait (2007) as Sam
 The Guard (2008) as Chad

External links

Living people
Canadian male actors of Chinese descent
Canadian male child actors
Canadian male film actors
Canadian people of Indonesian descent
Indonesian people of Chinese descent
Year of birth missing (living people)